Karwan Assembly constituency is a constituency of Telangana Legislative Assembly, India. It is one of 15 constituencies in Capital city of Hyderabad. It is part of Hyderabad Lok Sabha constituency.

Kausar Mohiuddin of  AIMIM is representing the constituency. It is one of the 7 Assembly constituencies won by All India Majlis-e-Ittehadul Muslimeen.

Extent of the constituency
The Assembly Constituency presently comprises the following neighbourhoods:

Members of Legislative Assembly

Election results

Telangana Legislative Assembly election, 2018

Telangana Legislative Assembly election, 2014

References

See also
 Karwan
 List of constituencies of Telangana Legislative Assembly

Assembly constituencies of Telangana